Pedro Osório  is a Brazilian municipality in the southeastern part of the state of Rio Grande do Sul. The population is 7,706 (2020 est.) in an area of 608.79 km². The municipality was founded on April 3, 1958 from parts of the municipalities of Canguçú and Arroio Grande. Cerrito was separated in 1997.

The municipality is by the Piratini River.  Its population is largely of Italian and Lebanese descent.

Bounding municipalities

Arroio Grande
Cerrito
Herval
Pelotas
Piratini

References

External links
 Official website of the prefecture
 http://www.citybrazil.com.br/rs/pedroosorio/ 

Municipalities in Rio Grande do Sul
Pelotas (micro-region)